Gorean subculture is a fandom based on the philosophy espoused in John Norman's long-running sword and planet novel series Chronicles of Counter-Earth.

Background
Gorean subculture developed independently of Norman's involvement, particularly starting as a fan network after the publishing houses ceased printing new paperback editions of the novels.  Fans allege that due to the controversy and pressure from feminist circles, the Gor books went out of print in the late 1980s (trade paperback and e-book sequel novels were subsequently published from 2001 to 2016). It does not have a uniform following but encompasses different groups of varying views and practices.

Gorean concepts

Although Norman's philosophy is concerned with the "order of nature" in a universal context of power and subordination, the Gorean subculture particularly focuses on the master-and-slave dynamic in sexual relationships and associated forms of female submission as portrayed in the novels. Therefore, although they are estimated to comprise less than 5% of the total female population on Gor, training and keeping a female slave (often known as a kajira) is central to Gorean subculture. Formal slave training, slave positions, and commands, as well as slave attire and beautification, are practices central to the Gorean subculture.

Gorean community

Literalists, otherwise known as lifestylers, incorporate elements from the Gorean culture and gender roles in their daily lives and some followers of an unofficial splinter group known as Kaotians who adhered to this approach were prosecuted for leading coercive sex cults. As opposed to literalists, the role players, divided into real-life sexual roleplayers (engaged or not engaged in BDSM practices) and online role-playing gamers (present particularly in Second Life) are not necessarily committed to Gorean philosophy and ideals. 

Starting from the 1990s, the Gorean subculture has become attractive to a number of male teenagers through role-playing in chat rooms. The teenage role-playing Goreans who concealed many of their personal aspects such as age or lack of experience, thanks to anonymity, managed to appeal to a considerable number of married and middle-aged women as kajirae in role-playing contexts. Such notoriety caused by this profile and related practices in the virtual Gorean community succeeded in creating disdain among both feminists and the BDSM community. Nevertheless, scholars have discussed the way that Gorean subculture groups on media such as Second Life and Internet Relay Chat have influenced the development of online role-playing and even the MMORPG genre.

Relationship to BDSM
Norman's non-fictional sex manual Imaginative Sex presents a series of elaborate fantasy scenarios to be acted out in isolated scenes. He also recommends the use of symbolic substitutes, such as the sound of claps as a substitute for whippings and other physical punishments. Pat Califia asserts that Norman was critical of the psychological and physical harm that non-stop BDSM slavery and corporal punishment might inflict. However, such views of Norman are not part of the Gorean canon and debate on Gorean practices' relationship to BDSM, focusing on aspects such as Total Power Exchange and further complicated by the community's diverse nature, continue. BDSM writer Michael Makai nevertheless asserts that Gorean fiction may be found responsible for shaping or otherwise popularizing many of today's established BDSM protocols and tenets.

See also
BDSM in culture and media
Dominance and submission
Master/slave (BDSM)
Sex slave

References

External links
 'The Last Days of Salernum' Second Life Gorean machinima.
 "Kajira Hill"'s account of living a Gorean lifestyle
For further links, see the "External links" section of the Gor article.
 

Gor
Science fiction fandom
Fantasy fandom
Literary fandom
Subcultures
Role-playing